"Anything" is a song by Polish singer Edyta Górniak, released as the second single from her self-titled second studio album (1997). The song was written by Pam Sheyne and Will Mowat, and produced by Christopher Neil. It charted in Poland and Belgium, and had some success in Spain. The maxi single includes a cover of A-Ha's song "Hunting High and Low", which was initially available as a bonus track only on the Japanese edition of the album. The single cover includes pictures by photographer Marlena Bielińska.

Music video

The accompanying music video for "Anything" was directed by Phil Griffin. The video starts with Edyta singing in a black room. Then Edyta is dancing with a group of dancers in front of her lover. In the next scene she is sitting at the edge of a bed, while her lover is sleeping. Next Edyta dances once again with her dancers. In the next scene Edyta is sitting on the floor in front of her sitting lover in a room with a red floor and white and red walls and he kiss her after a time. Afterwards different scenes were repeat and Edyta is also shown hugged and lying close to her lover in bed or also sitting on a chair behind her lover. The video ends with a close-up view of Edyta.

Track listing
 CD single
 "Anything" (Album Version) (3:57)
 "That's The Way I Feel About You" (3:59)

 Maxi single
 "Anything" (3:57)
 "That's The Way I Feel About You" (3:59)
 "Hunting High and Low" (3:39)

Charts

Credits and personnel

 Written by: Pam Sheyne, Will Mowat
 Producer: Christopher Neil
 Engineer, Mixed by: Simon Hurrell
 Assistant engineer: Gareth Ashton, Neil Tucker, Robert Catermole
 Electric guitar: Robbie McIntosh

 Keyboards, Bass, Drum Programming: Steve Pigott
 Additional keyboards: Nigel Rush, Christopher Neil
 Photo: Marlena Bielińska
 Recording company: EMI Music

References

1998 singles
1999 singles
Dance-pop songs
Songs written by Pam Sheyne
1997 songs
EMI Records singles
Song recordings produced by Christopher Neil